Star Wars: In Concert, previously referred to as Star Wars: A Musical Journey, is a series of concerts featuring a symphony orchestra and choir, along with footage from the Star Wars saga films displayed on a large LED screen at three stories tall. The screen is set to live performances of the Star Wars score composed by John Williams. The first performance took place in The O2 Arena in London, England and was attended by approximately 20,000 fans. The first North American tour started in Anaheim, California on October 1, 2009, and the second and most recent North American tour ended in London, Ontario on April 14, 2015. The concert series was scheduled to return sometime in 2016, but has since been delayed.

The concerts are narrated by Anthony Daniels, conducted by Dirk Brossé, and performed by the Royal Philharmonic Concert Orchestra. James Earl Jones provides his voice for Daniels' introduction.  The concert uses selected compositions from the Star Wars saga starting with Star Wars: Episode I – The Phantom Menace and ending with Episode VI: Return of the Jedi with an intermission between the two trilogies. Although the musical selections are presented in order according to episode, the film clips do not correlate to the film the music is from, but correlate thematically.

Scenes

Set one
 Opening: THX Deep Note, 20th Century Fox Fanfare, "Main Title/Blockade Runner"
 Dark Forces Conspire: "Duel of the Fates"
 A Hero Rises: "Anakin's Theme"
 Droids!: "The Dune Sea of Tatooine/Jawa Sandcrawler"
 A Race With Destiny: "The Flag Parade"
 Forbidden Love: "Across the Stars"
 A Hero Falls: "Battle of the Heroes"
 An Empire is Forged: "The Imperial March"

Intermission
The first set is followed by a twenty-minute intermission. The second set is preceded by a laser-light show that is synchronized with "Clash of the Lightsabers".

Set two
 A Narrow Escape: "Asteroid Field"
 A Defender Emerges: "Leia's Theme"
 An Unlikely Alliance: "Tales of a Jedi Knight"/"Cantina Band"
 A Jedi Is Trained: "Yoda's Theme"
 A Strike For Freedom: "TIE Fighter Attack"
 A Bond Unbroken: "Luke and Leia"
 Sanctuary Moon: "Forest Battle"
 A Life Redeemed: "Light of the Force"
 A New Day Dawns: "Throne Room/End Credits"

Encore
"The Imperial March"

Prop exhibit

Costumes
Chewbacca suit from Episode IV, V and VI
Darth Vader's armor
Queen Amidala's Galactic Senate Gown (without cloak)
Naboo handmaiden gowns
Naboo security guard uniform
Chancellor Palpatine robe
C-3PO from Episode III
Plo Koon costume
Kit Fisto costume from Episode II
Senate Guard armor and robe
Emperor's Royal Guard armor and robe
Ewok costumes from Episode VI
Props
Scout Trooper helmet from Episode VI
A-Wing Pilot helmet from Episode VI
Imperial gunner helmet from Episode IV
Han Solo in carbonite
Artwork
Kashyyyk by Ralph McQuarrie for the Star Wars Holiday Special
Concept art of various Kashyyyk scenes
Other
Sheet music for "The Droid Battle" for Episode I, written by John Williams
Many backdrops, including the Forest Moon of Endor, the Battle of Geonosis, Kashyyyk, the Death Star, Tatooine, and more.

References

Music of Star Wars
Star Wars fandom